WTHV-LD (channel 29) is a low-power television station in Huntsville, Alabama, United States, affiliated with the Spanish-language Telemundo network. It is owned by Gray Television alongside NBC affiliate WAFF (channel 48). The two stations share studios on Memorial Parkway (US 431) in Huntsville; WTHV-LD's transmitter is located south of Monte Sano State Park.

History
On January 19, 2022, it was announced that Gray Television would purchase the station, then known as WMJN-LD, from Emmanuel Broadcasting Corporation for $330,000; the sale was completed on March 8.

Gray announced on May 3, 2022, that it had reached an agreement with Telemundo to start Telemundo channels, primarily as adjuncts to Gray stations, in 22 additional Southern markets and renew existing affiliations in 12 others. The new service launched September 2, 2022, with the renamed WTHV-LD also carrying the main WAFF 48.1 subchannel as 29.2.

Subchannels
The station's digital signal is multiplexed:

References 

Low-power television stations in the United States
THV-LD
Television channels and stations established in 1992
Telemundo network affiliates
Gray Television